This article shows the on air team members for the ITV Breakfast programme Lorraine which began broadcasting in the United Kingdom on 6 September 2010. The main host is Lorraine Kelly, with guest presenters filling in during school holidays and when Kelly is absent (usually Christine Lampard).

Lorraine Kelly is now contracted to present the programme Monday to Friday, however previously from 2010 to 2012 a guest presenter would host each Friday edition. Guest presenters often appeared during holiday periods. Kate Garraway was appointed Kelly's deputy in September 2012 and took over hosting of Friday shows and holiday cover. As of the launch of Good Morning Britain in 2014, Lorraine Kelly hosted the Friday shows.

There are no current newsreaders for Lorraine as a format change starting 1 September 2014 means Lorraine no longer has a news update at 9:00am from Good Morning Britain.

Current on-air team

Former on-air team

References

External links

ITV Breakfast